The Palace of the Governor of Khulbuk is located in the center of village of Kurban-Shaid in the city of Vose in the Khatlon Region of Tajikistan. The palace was situated in the south-west part of the ancient town of Khisht-Tepa. Khulbuk was a center of the Huttal Region in 9th-12th centuries CE. The site has been proposed to be put on the World Heritage list of sites who have "outstanding universal value" to the world.

References

Tajikistani culture
Palaces in Asia
Palaces in Tajikistan